Körle is a municipality in the Schwalm-Eder district in Hesse, Germany. It lies about 20 km south of Kassel near the turn-off for Guxhagen on Autobahn A 7.

History
Körle was first mentioned in 1074 in a donation document from the Fulda monastery.

The community, as it is now, came into being as part of Hesse's municipal reforms, when the communities of Empfershausen, Lobenhausen and Wagenfurth were amalgamated with Körle on 1 February 1971.

Partnership
The community of Körle has maintained since 1991 a partnership with Floh-Seligenthal in Thuringia.

References

External links
Körle

Schwalm-Eder-Kreis